The Latin American Table Tennis Union (LATTU), or Unión Latinoamericana de Tenis de Mesa (ULTM) in Spanish, was one of the table tennis continental federations recognized by International Table Tennis Federation (ITTF) before 2021. The ULTM was composed of 37 national or regional table tennis associations, working on the development of table tennis in Latin America.

In 2019, the ULTM and the Northern American Table Tennis Union (NATTU) founded Pan American Table Tennis Confederation. The Confederation was recognised by the ITTF as the continental federation, replacing both the ULTM and the NATTU in 2021.

Members
List of total 37 member associations:
 - Anguilla Table Tennis Association
 - Antigua and Barbuda Table Tennis Association
 - Federación Argentina de Tenis de Mesa
 - Aruba Table Tennis Association
 - Barbados Table Tennis Association
 - Belize Table Tennis Association
 - Federación Boliviana de Tenis de Mesa
 - Confederação Brasileira de Tenis de Mesa
 - Cayman Islands Table Tennis Association
 - Federación Chilena de Tenis de Mesa
 - Federación Colombiana de Tenis de Mesa
 - Federación Costarricense de Tenis de Mesa
 - Federación Cubana de Tenis de Mesa
 - Curaçao Table Tennis Federation
 - Dominica Table Tennis Association
 - Federación Dominicana de Tenis de Mesa Inc.
 - Federación Ecuatoriana de Tenis de Mesa
 - Federación Salvadoreña de Tenis de Mesa
 - Grenada Table Tennis Association
 - Federación Nacional de Tenis de Mesa de Guatemala
 - Guyana Table Tennis Association
 - Association Haitienne de Tennis de Table
 - Federación Nacional de Tenis de Mesa de Honduras
 - Jamaican Table Tennis Association
 - Federación Mexicana de Tenis de Mesa
 - Federación Nicaragüense de Tenis de Mesa
 - Comisión Nacional de Tenis de Mesa de Panama
 - Federación Paraguaya de Tenis de Mesa
 - Federación Peruana de Tenis de Mesa
 - Federación Puertorriqueña de Tenis de Mesa
 - St. Kitts-Nevis Table Tennis Association
 - St. Lucia Table Tennis Association
 - St. Vincent and the Grenadines Table Tennis Association
 - Suriname Table Tennis Federation
 - Trinidad and Tobago Table Tennis Association
 - Federación Uruguaya de Tenis de Mesa
 - Federación Venezolana de Tenis de Mesa
As members of ITTF but NOT affiliated to ULTM:
  - British Virgin Islands Table Tennis Association
  - St. Maarten Table Tennis Federation

Competitions
Continental and regional championships held by ULTM are as follows:
Latin American Table Tennis Championships
Latin American Table Tennis Cup
Latin American Youth Table Tennis Championships

Central American Championships, CONCATEME Cup
Central American Junior and Cadet Championships
Central American Minicadet (U-13) Championships

Caribbean Senior Championships
Caribbean Junior and Cadet Championships
Caribbean Mini-Cadet (U-13) Championships

South American Championships
South American Junior and Cadet Championships
South American Mini-Cadet (U-13) Championships

Competitions organized by ULTM members and other organizations:
Pan-American Minicadet (U-13) Championships
Central American and Caribbean Games
Central American Games
South American Games (ODESUR Games)

References

External links
Official website of the ULTM (in Spanish)

Table tennis organizations
Table Tennis
Table tennis in South America
Table tennis in Latin America